Philippe Reynaud (3 February 1922 – 20 November 2018) was a French former field hockey player who competed in the 1948 Summer Olympics, in the 1952 Summer Olympics, and in the 1960 Summer Olympics.

References

External links
 

1922 births
2018 deaths
French male field hockey players
Olympic field hockey players of France
Field hockey players at the 1948 Summer Olympics
Field hockey players at the 1952 Summer Olympics
Field hockey players at the 1960 Summer Olympics